Sidewalk Stories is a 1989 American low-budget, nearly silent movie directed by and starring Charles Lane. The black-and-white film tells the story of a young African American man raising a small child after her father is murdered. The film is somewhat reminiscent of Charlie Chaplin's 1921 feature The Kid. The film was televised by PBS as well as saw limited exposure on VHS and cable television in the 1990s.

In October 2014, Sidewalk Stories was released on DVD and Blu-ray courtesy of Kino Lorber.

Plot summary

Cast
 Charles Lane - The Artist
 Tom Alpern - Bookseller
 Darnell Williams- The Father
 Nicole Alysia - Child
 Edwin Anthony - Penny Pincher 1
 Michael Baskin - Doorman/Cop
 Jeff Bates - Police Officer 2
 Angel Cappellino - Bully's Mother
 Jeffrey Carpentier - Homeless Native American
 John Carr - S.O.B. Man
 Vince Castelano - Child Customer 3
 Jimmy Clohessy - Precinct Cop 2
 Robert Clohessy - Alley Tough 1
 Sandye Wilson- Girlfriend
 Deena Engle - Park Mother 1
 Ellia English - Bag Lady
 Edie Falco - Woman in Carriage
 Trula Hoosier - Mother

Reception
Rotten Tomatoes gives the film a rating of 79% from 42 reviews. The consensus summarizes: "Sidewalk Stories sweetness is somewhat undermined by the movie's broad approach, but it remains a comedy with heart -- and something to say."

References

External links
 
 
 
 
 
 Los Angeles Times review of Sidewalk Stories
 New York Times review of Sidewalk Stories
 Roger Ebert review of Sidewalk Stories
 Sidewalk Stories soundtrack (with audio samples) at Soundtrack.net

American silent feature films
Films based on short fiction
1989 directorial debut films
American black-and-white films
Films directed by Charles Lane (filmmaker)
1980s American films